Muzaffarpur Institute of Technology (commonly referred to as MIT, Muzaffarpur) is a public, coeducational engineering college in Muzaffarpur, Bihar, India.  It is administered by the Department of Science and Technology, Bihar and funded by Government of Bihar. It was founded in 1954, just after India attained independence in 1947. The foundation stone was laid by the first Prime Minister of India, Jawaharlal Nehru. It runs undergraduate and postgraduate  programmes in Engineering and Pharmacy. The institute has a campus at Muzaffarpur.

History

MIT (established with the name College of Civil Engineering, Muzaffarpur) began on 25 September 1954 with one discipline: Civil Engineering.
Committee recommended the establishment of higher technical institutions in India, along the lines of the Massachusetts Institute of Technology and consulting from the University of Illinois at Urbana–Champaign along with affiliated secondary institutions. The report urged that work should start with the speedy establishment of major institutions in the four quarters of the country with the ones in the east and the west to be set up immediately
It was inaugurated by C.P.N. Singh, governor of then East Punjab (now Punjab, Haryana and parts of Himachal Pradesh). The first Prime Minister of India Jawaharlal Nehru laid the foundation of the main building on 21 April 1956. Mechanical Engineering and Electrical Engineering disciplines were added in 1960 and the institute was renamed as Muzaffarpur Institute of Technology. Pharmacy and Leather Technology were added in 1978 and 1986 respectively. Information Technology and Electronics and Communication Engineering disciplines were introduced in 2001. In December 2008, the government of Bihar declared that MIT would be developed into a model engineering college.

Campus
The campus is in the north-west corner of Muzaffarpur city, along Muzaffarpur–Motihari road, and spread over an area of  four kilometers from Muzaffarpur railway station. The institute is flanked by the river Burhi Gandak on the north, a reservoir on the east, Muzaffarpur–Motihari road on the south, and the road network on the west.

The campus is divided into following zones:
 Academic Zone that includes department offices, lecture theaters, libraries
 Student Residential Zone
 Faculty and Staff Residential Zone
 Student Recreational Area that includes football ground, cricket ground, badminton courts.
 AVH is the hall for the cultural activities.
 It has also separate building for branches like Information technology building, electronic and communications building, lab building for physics and chemistry.

The campus has student activity centre, primary school named MIT Bal Niketan International School, branch of State Bank of India, post office, central bank of india and a temple.

Academic departments
 Department of Civil Engineering
 Department of Mechanical Engineering
 Department of Electrical Engineering
 Department of Electronics and Communication Engineering 
 Department of Information Technology
 Department of Biomedical Robotics Engineering
 Department of Leather Technology
 Department of Pharmacy 
 Department of Mathematics
 Department of Physics
 Department of Chemistry
 Department of Humanities

Academics

Admission
From 2019 onwards, admissions will be based on national Joint Entrance Examination – Main merit list. Students who want to enroll must appear at the exam that is conducted by National Testing Agency.

Earlier Undergraduate admissions were done through the Bihar Combined Entrance Competitive Examination Board). The entrance examination was held in two stages: First stage was the screening test or preliminary test. The screened candidates had to appear in the main examination (second stage). Based on the merit list in the second stage, successful candidates were allotted seats in different engineering colleges of Bihar.

Admission to postgraduate programmes is based upon score and rank in Graduate Aptitude Test in Engineering (GATE) conducted by IITs/IISc.

University affiliation

Degree programs

Bachelor of Technology (B.Tech)

MIT has the following branches at the undergraduate Bachelor of Technology level. The number of seats available in each discipline is given in parentheses:
 Civil Engineering (60)
 Mechanical Engineering (60)
 Electrical Engineering (60)
 Electronics and Communication Engineering (40)
 Information Technology (40)
 Leather Technology (30)

Bachelor of Pharmacy (B.Pharm.)
 Bachelor of Pharmacy (60)

Master of Technology 
At the postgraduate M.Tech level MIT has the following branches:
 Machine Design (under the department of Mechanical Engineering) (18 full-time + 4 part-time)
 Thermal Engineering (under the department of Mechanical Engineering) (18 full-time + 5 part-time)
 Manufacturing Technology (under the department of Mechanical Engineering) (18 full-time )

Facilities for Ph.D. research exist in all departments.

Student life

Hostels
There are seven boys hostels having a capacity to accommodate 1400 students and one girls hostel (the Golden Jubilee Girls Hostel) with a capacity to accommodate 200 students.hostel -01(damodar hostel) was constructed in 1952 before college main building was constructed.
Guest Houses for parents and others are also located in the campus.

MIT Sports Club
The sports club has been functioning since 1954 and provides facilities for Cricket, Lawn Tennis, Badminton, Volleyball, Basketball, Football Table- Tennis and Indore games. But since 2000 the sports club became inactive and unofficially closed. Later on, in 2017 a group of students from 2K15 batch has relaunched the platform of sports in this college as MIT SPORTS CLUB.  The club organizes the institute's annual sports, an Inter-college sports meet and severals of lawn tennis, badminton, chess, etc. tournament every year at MIT sports grounds. Inter college and Interstates tournaments held every year.

Other
Junoon

 
The Start-up cell in MIT, Muzaffarpur is established on 16 January 2018.

SIRTDO
The Small Industries Research, Training and Development Organization (SIRTDO) was established at MIT in 1976 with financial support from the government of Bihar with the objective to encourage entrepreneurship among MIT students. The organization organizes orientation programmes with the collaboration of other national level institutes. SIRTDO acts as incubation center for new business ventures by providing facilities at the campus and provides training to the entrepreneurs in product design, development and management, marketing and finance.

References

External links
 
 BCECE Board website
 Aryabhatta Knowledge University website
 DST, Bihar website

Engineering colleges in Bihar
Education in Muzaffarpur
Colleges affiliated to Aryabhatta Knowledge University
1954 establishments in Bihar
Educational institutions established in 1954